Rashad Emmanuel Unique Barksdale (born May 11, 1984) is a former American football cornerback of the Arena Football League (AFL). He was drafted by the Philadelphia Eagles in the sixth round of the 2007 NFL Draft. He played college football at Albany.

Barksdale was also a member of the Kansas City Chiefs, New York Giants, New York Jets and Arizona Cardinals.

College career
At Albany, he led the Great Danes in interceptions and punt returns in 2006.

Professional career

Philadelphia Eagles
Barksdale was drafted by the Philadelphia Eagles in the 6th round (201st overall) of the 2007 NFL Draft. He is the second player in Albany history to be drafted into the NFL. He was released by the Eagles on September 1, 2007 during the preseason.

Kansas City Chiefs
The next day, Barksdale signed a contract to play for the Kansas City Chiefs, which made Barksdale the first player in the history of the SUNY Albany to make an NFL 53-man roster.

Barksdale made his NFL regular season debut on October 7, 2007, making him the first UAlbany player to appear in an NFL regular season game when he took the field on special teams for the opening kickoff. He also played on the punt cover and punt return units and made a fourth-quarter tackle with 6:08 remaining.

Barksdale was released by the Chiefs during final cuts on August 30, 2008.

New York Giants
Barksdale was signed to the practice squad of the New York Giants on September 1, 2008. He was promoted to the active roster on December 30 when cornerback Sam Madison was placed on injured reserve. He was waived on June 20, 2009.

New York Jets

Barksdale was claimed off waivers by the New York Jets on June 25, 2009. He was waived on September 5, 2009.

Arizona Cardinals
The Arizona Cardinals signed Barksdale to their practice squad on September 8. He was re-signed to a future contract on January 18, 2010.

Barksdale was waived on August 6, 2010.

Calgary Stampeders
In March 2011 Barksdale was signed by the Calgary Stampeders.

Kansas City Command
In 2011, Barksdale signed to play with the Kansas City Command in the Arena Football League

Tampa Bay Storm
Barksdale was assigned to the Tampa Bay Storm in 2013. On September 17, 2013, Barksdale was replaced on retirement by the Storm.

Cleveland Gladiators
Barksdale came out of retirement in July 2014 to help the Cleveland Gladiators in their ArenaBowl attempt.

References

External links
New York Giants bio

1984 births
Living people
Players of American football from New York (state)
American football cornerbacks
Albany Great Danes football players
Philadelphia Eagles players
Kansas City Chiefs players
New York Giants players
New York Jets players
Arizona Cardinals players
Kansas City Command players
People from Hudson, New York
Tampa Bay Storm players
Cleveland Gladiators players
University at Albany, SUNY alumni